Sauat Mukhametbayuly Mynbayev (Sauat Mūhametbaiūly Myñbaev) is a Kazakh politician who served as the minister of oil and gas of Kazakhstan from 2010 to 2013. Until 2021 he was also the CEO of Kazakhstan Temir zholy.

Biography 
Mynbayev was born on 19 November 1962. In 1985, he received a degree in economics from Moscow State University and he obtained a master's degree again in economics in 1988.

Labor activity began as a teacher of the Almaty Institute of National Economy of the Kazakh SSR.

In 1991—1992, he worked as President of the Republican Construction Exchange "Kazakhstan".

In 1992—1995 — First Deputy Chairman of the Board of Joint Stock Bank "Kazkommertsbank".

In 1995, he was appointed as Deputy Minister of Finance of the Republic of Kazakhstan — the head of the Treasury; First Deputy Minister of Finance of the Republic of Kazakhstan.

In 1998, by the decree of the President of the Republic of Kazakhstan, he was appointed Minister of Finance of the Republic of Kazakhstan.

In 1999, he was appointed Deputy Head of the Presidential Administration of the Republic of Kazakhstan.

From 1999 to 2001 — Minister of Agriculture of the Republic of Kazakhstan.

Since 2001, he worked as president of the "Bank of Development of Kazakhstan".

In 2002—2003, he headed the Caspian Industrial Financial Group.

From June 2003 — Deputy Prime Minister of the Republic of Kazakhstan.

Since 2004 — Deputy Prime Minister — Minister of Industry and Trade.

From February 2006, he headed the JSC "Holding on the management of state assets "Samruk"".

From September 2007 until March 2010, Mynbayev was the minister of energy and mineral resources. 

On 12 March 2010, he was named as the head of the newly created ministry of oil and gas. Mynbayev's term ended on 3 July 2013 and he was replaced by Uzakbay Karabalin in the post.

2018—2021 — Chairman of the Board of the Joint-Stock Company «НК „Қазақстан темір жолы“».

Activities 
In 2009, Mynbayev and Chinese officials discussed the current state and prospects of cooperation within the CNPC-AktobeMunaiGaz JV to develop Kenkiyak and Zhanazhol oilfields; they also dwelt on completion of the 2nd segment of the Kazakhstan-China oil pipeline as well as on new bilateral projects.

Paradise Papers 
In November 2017 an investigation conducted by the International Consortium of Investigative Journalism cited his name in the list of politicians named in "Paradise Papers" allegations.

Awards 

 Order "Ounce" I degree (2018);
Order "Ounce" II degree (2012);
Order "Ounce" III degree (2005);
Order of Friendship (December 12, 2004, Russia);
Medal "10 years of Astana".

External links

References 

1962 births
Living people
Ministers of Finance (Kazakhstan)
Ministers of Industry (Kazakhstan)
Ministers of Trade (Kazakhstan)
Ministers of Agriculture (Kazakhstan)
Oil and gas ministers of Kazakhstan
Ministers of Energy (Kazakhstan)
Moscow State University alumni
People named in the Paradise Papers
Deputy Prime Ministers of Kazakhstan